Hemlock Knoll is a mountain located in the Catskill Mountains of New York southwest of Andes. Craig Hill is located northwest, Murphy Hill is located southwest, and Grays Mountain is located east of Hemlock Knoll.

References

Mountains of Delaware County, New York
Mountains of New York (state)